is the studio album by Japanese singer-songwriter Yosui Inoue, released in November 1992.

The album comprises the newly arranged versions of the songs that Inoue himself had already recorded on his albums or singles, except "Just Fit" which was written for Mis Cast album by Kenji Sawada in 1982. Inoue stated that over 20 songs were re-recorded during the sessions. Rest of them excluded from the album have not been released, except "No-ichigo" appeared on the flip side of a single "Musubikotoba".

Track listing
All songs written and composed by Yōsui Inoue, unless otherwise noted
"" - 4:32
"" - 4:32
"" (Katz Hoshi/Inoue) - 5:31
"" - 4:11
"" (Kei Ogura/Inoue) - 5:18
"" - 4:07
"Just Fit" - 4:26
"" - 5:13
"" - 5:10
"" - 5:22
"" - 5:21

Chart positions

Album

Single

References

1992 albums
Yōsui Inoue albums